Ibrahim Ali Chatuli (1894–1984) was a Bangladeshi Islamic scholar, politician and social reformer. He was the Education Minister of Assam Legislative Council, and an elected Member of the Assam Legislative Assembly belonging to the Jamiat Ulema-e-Hind political party. His constituency joined the East Bengal Legislative Assembly after the Partition of India in 1947.

Early life 
Ibrahim Ali Chatuli was born in 1894, to a Bengali Muslim family in the village of Haratail in Barachatul Union, Kanaighat, Sylhet District. His father Munshi Abdul Karim was a scholar and poet. He studied at Jhingabari Alia Madrasa in Kanaighat, Ajiria Madrasa in Golapganj and Rampur Madrasa in India. He was a disciple of Hussain Ahmad Madani.

Career 
Ibrahim Chatuli was for a long time the Imam and Khatib of Sylhet Nayasarak Jame Mosque. In 1938 he was elected a Member of the British Parliament from Jamiat Ulema-e-Hind. After that he was the Education Minister of Assam Provincial Council. During the 1946 Indian provincial elections, he was elected as a Member of the Assam Legislative Assembly (MLA) from Jamiat Ulema-e-Hind in the Sylhet Sadar-N constituency. After the Sylhet referendum which incorporated the district into Pakistan, he became a member of the East Bengal Legislative Assembly.

Was the general secretary of the then Ulema-e-Hind in the province of Assam, The undisputed leader of the anti-British movement (Indian independence movement), the Secretary General of the All India Students Federation.

Death 
Chatuli died in 1984.

References 

1894 births
1984 deaths
Deobandis
Indian independence activists from Bengal
People from Kanaighat Upazila
Bengali Muslim scholars of Islam
Bangladeshi Muslims
20th-century Bengalis
20th-century Muslim scholars of Islam